Ndeeba is a neighborhood in the city of Kampala, Uganda's capital.

Location
Ndeeba is located in Lubaga Division, one of the five administrative divisions of Kampala. It lies on the southern edge of the city. It is bordered by Mengo to the north, Katwe to the northeast, Kibuye to the east, Makindye and Najjanankumbi to the southeast, Kabowa to the south, Mutundwe to the west and Lubaga to the northwest.

Overview
Ndeeba lies on the main highway (A-109), between Kampala and Masaka. It was a trading center and a lower middle-class residential area in the 1950s and 1960s. Today, Ndeeba has morphed into a busy metropolitan area with businesses, small industries, retail shops and a thriving farmers market. Many of the leading financial houses in Uganda maintain branches in the area due to the booming business in commercial and retail banking in the neighborhood. Behind the thriving business environment along the main road, lies a sprawling slum with all the challenges that come with crowded, poor, urban living.

Points of interest
The following points of interest lie in or near Ndeeba:
 A branch of Bank of Africa
 A branch of Barclays Bank
 A branch of Ecobank
 A branch of Equity Bank (Uganda)
 A branch of DFCU Bank
 A branch of Kenya Commercial Bank
 A branch of PostBank Uganda
 A branch of United Bank for Africa
 Ndeeba Farmers Market

See also

References

External links
 Fire Guts Timber Stores in Kampala

Neighborhoods of Kampala
Lubaga Division